The women's ski slopestyle competition of the 2015 Winter Universiade was held at Sulayr Snowpark, Sierra Nevada, Spain on February 9, 2015.

Results

Qualification

Finals

Women's slopestyle